The National Institute for Environmental eScience (NIEeS) was a collaboration between Natural Environment Research Council (NERC) and the University of Cambridge. It was established in July 2002 and in addition to its main role of promoting and supporting the use of e-Science and grid technologies within the field of environmental research, its purpose was to:

 Train scientists in environmental eScience
 Demonstrate environmental eScience
 Help develop the environmental eScience community
 Aid collaborations between scientists and industries

It was intended as a national resource to be "owned by the whole community". The website remains available; however, the contract for the project ended in August 2008.

References

External links
National Institute for Environmental eScience

Conservation in the United Kingdom
Defunct websites
Environmental eScience, National Institute for
E-Science
Environmental organisations based in the United Kingdom
Information technology organisations based in the United Kingdom
Natural Environment Research Council
Research institutes in Cambridge
Scientific organisations based in the United Kingdom
2002 establishments in the United Kingdom
Scientific organizations established in 2002